The Athenaeum is a faculty club and private social club on the California Institute of Technology campus in Pasadena, California.

Building
The Athenaeum was designed by Gordon Kaufmann in the Mediterranean Revival style, with landscape design by Florence Yoch and Lucile Council, and opened in 1930.  It includes a restaurant, a private hotel with several named suites (e.g. The Einstein Suite, where Albert Einstein lived while at Caltech), and serves as Caltech's Faculty Club.

Members
Membership includes Caltech faculty, staff, graduate students, undergraduate seniors, alumni, trustees, and Associates of the California Institute of Technology, and staff of the Jet Propulsion Laboratory (JPL), the Palomar Observatory, and the Huntington Library and Art Gallery.

Notable regulars at the Athenaeum Round Table have included: 
 David Baltimore  
 Robert Christy  
 Lee Alvin DuBridge  
 Richard Feynman  
 William Alfred Fowler  
 Scott Fraser  
 Jesse L. Greenstein  
 Charles Christian Lauritsen  
 Maarten Schmidt

See also
 List of American gentlemen's clubs

References

Faculty clubs
Clubs and societies in California
Gentlemen's clubs in California
California Institute of Technology buildings and structures
Clubhouses in California
Buildings and structures completed in 1930
1930 establishments in California
Mediterranean Revival architecture in California
Algonquin Round Table